Saleh Abdulla Obaid Mohsen Al-Areefi (8 December 1978) is an Emirati association footballer who played as a defender for United Arab Emirates in the 2004 AFC Asian Cup.

References

External links

1978 births
Living people
Emirati footballers
United Arab Emirates international footballers
Association football defenders
2004 AFC Asian Cup players
Al Jazira Club players
Al Ain FC players
UAE Pro League players